Daws is a surname and may refer to:

Surname
Gavan Daws (born 1933), an author of Pacific island history and informational books
Lenny Daws (born 1978), an English light-welterweight boxer
Nick Daws (born 1970), an English former footballer 
Nico Daws (born 2000), an ice hockey goaltender
Robert Daws (born 1959), an English stage and television actor
Ron Daws (1937–1992), an American marathon athlete
Tony Daws (born 1966), an English former footballer

See also 
 Daws (disambiguation)
 Dawes (surname)
 Daws Butler (1916–1988), a voice actor famous for portraying Yogi Bear and Huckleberry Hound